Frampton West End is a settlement in Lincolnshire, England. It is in the civil parish of Frampton

External links

Villages in Lincolnshire